The makeup of poker's dead man's hand has varied through the years. Currently, it is described as a two-pair poker hand consisting of the black aces and black eights. The pair of aces and eights, along with an unknown hole card, were reportedly held by Old West folk hero, lawman, and gunfighter Wild Bill Hickok when he was murdered while playing a game. No contemporaneous source, however, records the exact cards he held when killed.  Author Frank Wilstach's 1926 book, Wild Bill Hickok: The Prince of Pistoleers, led to the popular modern held conception of the poker hand's contents.

Use of the phrase
The expression, "dead man's hand", appears to have had some currency in the late 19th and early 20th centuries, although no one connected it to Hickok until the 1920s.<ref name="Dope">[http://www.straightdope.com/columns/read/275/was-wild-bill-hickok-holding-the-dead-mans-hand-when-he-was-slain "Was Wild Bill Hickok Holding the Dead Mans Hand When He Was Slain] ; The Straight Dope article; retrieved March 2013.</ref> The earliest detailed reference to it was 1886, where it was described as a "full house consisting of three jacks and a pair of tens". Jacks and sevens are called the dead man's hand in the 1903 Encyclopaedia of Superstitions, Folklore, and the Occult Sciences. The 1907 edition of Hoyle's Games'' refers to the hand as jacks and eights.

Hickok's hand
What is currently considered the dead man's hand card combination received its notoriety from a legend that it was the five-card stud or five-card draw hand, held by James Butler Hickok (better known as "Wild Bill" Hickok) when he was shot in the back of the head by Jack McCall on August 2, 1876, in Nuttal & Mann's Saloon, Deadwood, Dakota Territory. Hickok's final hand purportedly included the aces and eights of both black suits.

According to a book by Western historian Carl W. Breihan, the cards were retrieved from the floor by a man named Neil Christy, who then passed them on to his son. The son, in turn, told Mr. Breihan of the composition of the hand. "Here is an exact identity of these cards as told to me by Christy's son: the ace of diamonds with a heel mark on it; the ace of clubs; the two black eights, clubs and spades, and the queen of hearts with a small drop of Hickok's blood on it," though nothing of the sort was reported at the time immediately following the shooting.

Hickok biographer Joseph Rosa wrote about the make-up of the hand: "The accepted version is that the cards were the ace of spades, the ace of clubs, two black eights, and the queen of clubs as the 'kicker'."  Rosa, however, said that no contemporaneous source can be found for this exact hand.  The solidification in gamers' parlance of the dead man's hand as two pairs, black aces and eights, did not come about until after the 1926 publication of Wilstach's book—50 years after Hickok's death.

Legacy
The Las Vegas Metropolitan Police Department Homicide Division, the Los Angeles Police Department CRASH squad, and the Armed Forces Medical Examiner System all use some variation of the aces and eights dead man's hand in their insignia. The Deadwood Police Department uses it as a patch on their uniforms.

See also

 Dead man's hand in popular culture

References

External links
Dead Mans Hand: Wild Bill's Aces and Eights

Poker hands
Legends
American frontier
Superstitions